The Visa Waiver Program (VWP) is a program of the United States federal government that allows nationals of specific countries to travel to the U.S. for tourism, business, or while in transit for up to 90 days without having to obtain a visa. It applies to all fifty U.S. states, the District of Columbia, Puerto Rico, and the U.S. Virgin Islands, as well as to Guam and the Northern Mariana Islands, which also have an additional program with waivers for more nationalities; American Samoa has a similar but separate program.

All the countries selected for the VWP by the U.S. government are  generally regarded as developed countries, with high-income economies and a very high Human Development Index.

Other visa waivers exist for citizens of certain jurisdictions.

Eligible countries

To be eligible for a visa waiver under the VWP, the traveler seeking admission to the United States must be a national of a country that has been designated by the U.S. Secretary of Homeland Security, in consultation with the Secretary of State, as a "program country". Permanent residents of designated countries who are not their nationals do not qualify for a visa waiver. The criteria for designation as program countries are specified in Section 217(c) of the Immigration and Nationality Act. The criteria stress passport security, a nonimmigrant visa refusal rate below 3%, and a reciprocal visa waiver for U.S. nationals, among other requirements.

As of 2022, nationals of 40 countries are eligible for visa-free entry into the United States under the VWP:

Eligibility for the visa waiver may be withdrawn at any time. This may happen if the United States believes that nationals of a certain country are more likely than before to violate their VWP restrictions, such as working without a permit or overstaying their allowed period of stay in the United States. Accordingly, Argentina's participation in the VWP was terminated in 2002 in light of the financial crisis taking place in that country and its potential effect on mass emigration and unlawful overstay of its nationals in the United States by way of the VWP. Uruguay's participation in the program was revoked in 2003 for similar reasons. While a country's political and economic standing does not directly determine its eligibility, it is widely believed that nationals of politically stable and economically developed nations would not have much incentive to illegally seek employment and violate their visa while in the United States, risks that consular officers seriously consider in approving or denying a visa.

Requirements

Passport
All visitors from VWP countries must hold a biometric passport.

All travelers must have individual passports. It is not acceptable (for the VWP) for children to be included on a parent's passport, although the practice is  rare today.

In principle, the passport must be valid for six months beyond the expected date of departure from the United States. However, the United States has agreements with a large number of countries to waive this requirement, including all VWP countries except Brunei.

Electronic System for Travel Authorization (ESTA)

All incoming passengers who intend to take advantage of the Visa Waiver Program are required to apply for a travel authorization through the Electronic System for Travel Authorization (ESTA) online before departure to the United States, preferably at least 72 hours (3 days) in advance. This requirement was announced on June 3, 2008 and is intended to bolster U.S. security by pre-screening participating VWP passengers against terrorist or no-fly lists and databases. It is similar to Australia's Electronic Travel Authority system. The authorization is mandatory for participating VWP nationals before traveling to the United States, but as with formal visas this does not guarantee admission into the United States since final admission eligibility is determined at U.S. ports of entry by CBP officers.

ESTA has an application fee of $4, and if approved, an additional fee of $17 is charged, for a total of $21. An approved ESTA is valid for up to two years or until the traveler's passport expires, whichever comes first, and is valid for multiple entries into the United States.

When traveling to the United States by air or sea under the VWP with ESTA, the person must be traveling on a participating commercial carrier and hold a valid return or onward ticket, dated within 90 days. The VWP does not apply at all (i.e. a visa is required) if a passenger arrives via air or sea on an unapproved carrier. ESTA is also required for travel by land.

Prior travel or dual nationality in certain countries
Since 2016, those who have previously traveled to Iran, Iraq, Libya, North Korea, Somalia, Sudan, Syria or Yemen on or after March 1, 2011, or to Cuba on or after January 12, 2021, or who are dual nationals of Iran, Iraq, North Korea, Sudan or Syria, are not eligible to travel under the VWP. However, those who traveled to such countries as diplomats, military, journalists, humanitarian workers or legitimate businessmen may have this ineligibility waived by the Secretary of Homeland Security.

Place of birth outside country of nationality
Applicants for ESTA asserting eligibility based on Hungarian nationality are automatically denied if they were not born in Hungary. This restriction was noted by the Hungarian government and media due to a consistent pattern of denials, but it was not publicly announced by the U.S. government. Some details are unclear, such as for those born in an area that was part of Hungary at the time but later annexed to another country. In any case, those who also have another nationality and apply for the VWP based on that nationality (if the respective country of nationality is part of the Visa Waiver Program) are not affected by this restriction.

Other requirements
Applicants for admission under the Visa Waiver Program:
 Must have complied with the conditions of all previous admissions to the United States and have not been found ineligible for a U.S. visa.
 Must never have been convicted of, or arrested for, an offense or crime involving moral turpitude (there is an exemption in some cases for a single offence committed before age 18 and the crime was committed (and the alien released from any confinement to a prison or correctional institution imposed for the crime) more than five years before the date of application for a visa, and also for a single instance if the maximum possible sentence in the U.S. is one year or less in jail, and less than six months was served. However these exceptions cannot be applied by the individual as the question on ESTA is specific) or a "controlled substance, or (two or more) crimes with a maximum aggregate sentence of five years' imprisonment or more, no matter how long ago. National regulations which normally expunge criminal records after a certain length of time (e.g. the Rehabilitation of Offenders Act 1974 in the UK) do not apply.
 Must not be otherwise inadmissible to the United States, such as on health or national security grounds.
 Must be intending to visit the United States for a purpose of tourism, business or transit.

Applicants should display social and economic ties which bind them to their country of origin or may be refused entry.

Having been arrested or convicted does not in itself make a person ineligible to use the Visa Waiver Program. However, some U.S. embassies advise such persons to apply for a tourist visa even though there is no legal obligation to do so.

Those who do not meet the requirements for the Visa Waiver Program must obtain a U.S. visitor visa from a U.S. embassy or consulate.

Restrictions
Visitors under the VWP may stay for up to 90 days in the United States and cannot request an extension of the original allowed period of stay (this practice is allowed to those holding regular visas). However, VWP visitors may seek to adjust status on the basis of either marriage to a U.S. citizen or an application for asylum.

U.S. Customs and Border Protection (CBP) officers determine admissibility upon the traveler's arrival. If one seeks to enter the U.S. under the VWP and is denied entry by a CBP officer at a port of entry, there is no path to appeal or review of the denial of entry.

Travelers can leave to neighboring jurisdictions (Canada, Mexico and the Caribbean), but will not be granted another 90 days after reentry in the United States; instead they are readmitted to the United States for the remaining days granted on their initial entry. Transit through the United States is generally permitted, if the total time in the United States, Canada, Mexico and adjacent islands is less than 90 days. However, if for example the traveler is transiting the United States on the way to a 6-month stay in Canada, the VWP cannot be used, as the total time in the United States, Canada, Mexico and adjacent islands will be over 90 days. In this case the traveler should apply for a B-1/B-2 visa, or a transit visa.

There are restrictions on the type of employment-related activities allowed. Meetings and conferences in relation to the travelers' profession, line of business or employer in their home country are generally acceptable, but most forms of "gainful employment" are not. There are however poorly-classifiable exceptions such as persons performing professional services in the United States for a non-U.S. employer, and persons installing, servicing and repairing commercial or industrial equipment or machinery pursuant to a contract of sale. Performers (such as actors and musicians) who plan on performing live or taping scenes for productions in their country of origin, as well as athletes participating in an athletic event, are likewise not allowed to use the VWP for their respective engagements and are instead required to have an O or P visa prior to arrival. Foreign media representatives and journalists on assignment are required to have a nonimmigrant media (I) visa.

History
Congress passed legislation in 1986 to create the Visa Waiver Program with the aim of facilitating tourism and short-term business visits to the United States, and allowing the United States Department of State to focus consular resources on addressing higher risks. The United Kingdom became the first country to participate in the Visa Waiver Program in July 1988, followed by Japan in December 1988. In July 1989, France, Italy, Netherlands, Sweden, Switzerland and West Germany were added to the VWP.

In 1991, more European countries joined the Program – Andorra, Austria, Belgium, Denmark, Finland, Iceland, Liechtenstein, Luxembourg, Monaco, Norway, San Marino and Spain – as well as New Zealand (the first country from Oceania). In 1993, Brunei became the second Asian country to be admitted to the Program.

On April 1, 1995, Ireland was added to the VWP. In 1996, Australia and Argentina (the first Latin American country) joined, although Argentina was later removed in 2002. On September 30, 1997, Slovenia was added. On August 9, 1999, Portugal, Singapore and Uruguay joined the program, although Uruguay was subsequently removed in 2003.

Following the September 11 terrorist attacks, the George W. Bush administration decided to tighten entry requirements into the United States, as a result of which legislation was passed requiring foreign visitors entering under the Visa Waiver Program to present a machine-readable passport upon arrival starting from October 1, 2003, and a biometric passport from October 26, 2004. However, as a number of VWP countries still issued non-machine readable passports (for example, more than a third of French and Spanish passport holders held a non-machine readable version), the implementation of this rule was postponed to October 26, 2004, with the exception of Belgian nationals, as there were concerns about the security and integrity of Belgian passports. Likewise, the biometric passport requirement was also postponed to October 26, 2005, only to be further postponed by another year to October 26, 2006 at the request of the European Union, which raised concerns about the number of participating countries which would have been able to make the deadline. When the new rule came into force on that day, three countries (Andorra, Brunei and Liechtenstein) had not yet started issuing biometric passports.

In November 2006, the U.S. government announced that plans for an "Electronic Travel Authorization" program (officially named "Electronic System for Travel Authorization") would be developed so that VWP travelers can give advance information on their travels to the United States. In return, they will be given authorization electronically to travel to the United States, although it does not guarantee admission to the United States. This program is modeled on the Electronic Travel Authority scheme that has been used in Australia for many years.

Road map
After the 2004 enlargement of the European Union, both the newly admitted countries and EU agencies began intensive lobbying efforts to include those new countries in the VWP. The U.S. government initially responded to those efforts by developing bilateral strategies with 19 candidate countries known as the Visa Waiver road map process. The U.S. government began to accept the possibility of departing from the original country designation criteria – which had been contained within immigration law per se – and to expand them by adding political criteria, with the latter being able to override the former. This development began first with Bill S.2844 which explicitly named Poland as the only country to be added to the VWP, and continued as an amendment to the Comprehensive Immigration Reform Act of 2006 (S.2611), whose Sec. 413, Visa Waiver Program Expansion, defined broader criteria that would apply to any EU country that provided "material support" to the multinational forces in Iraq and Afghanistan. However, the definition of that "material support" would be met again only by Poland and Romania, a fact that was not favorably received by the other EU candidate countries. Ironically, Poland remained the only Central European country that was not a participating nation in the VWP until 2019, due to a visa refusal rate above the critical threshold of 3%.

During his visit to Estonia in November 2006, President Bush announced his intention "to work with our Congress and our international partners to modify our visa waiver program". In 2006, the Secure Travel and Counterterrorism Partnership Bill was introduced in the Senate but no action was taken and that bill, as well as a similar one introduced in the House the following year, died after two years of inactivity. The bill would have directed the Secretary of Homeland Security to establish a pilot program to expand the visa waiver program for up to five new countries that were cooperating with the United States on security and counterterrorism matters.

A June 2007 Hudson Institute Panel stressed the urgency of the inclusion of Central Europe in the VWP: "An inexplicable policy that is causing inestimable damage to the United States with its new Central and Eastern European NATO allies is the region's exclusion from the visa waiver program. As Helle Dale wrote in the spring issue of European Affairs: "Meanwhile, the problem is fueling anti-U.S. antagonisms and a perception of capricious discrimination by U.S. bureaucrats ---and damping the visits to the U.S. of people from countries with whom Washington would like to improve commercial and intellectual ties. Meanwhile, horror stories abound from friends and diplomats from Central and Eastern Europe about the problems besetting foreigners seeking to visit the United States. In fact bringing up the subject of visas with any resident of those countries is like waving a red flag before a bull." Visa waiver must be satisfactorily addressed and resolved at long last."

The Implementing Recommendations of the 9/11 Commission Act of 2007 allowed the inclusion of new countries in the VWP with a visa refusal rate up to 10% (up from the standard requirement of 3%) if they satisfied certain other conditions, from October 2008. With the relaxed criteria, eight countries were added to the program: Czech Republic, Estonia, Hungary, Latvia, Lithuania, Slovakia and South Korea in November 2008, and Malta in December 2008. Czech Prime Minister Mirek Topolánek called it "a removal of the last relict of Communism and the Cold War". However, from July 2009, the authority to include countries with such higher visa refusal rate became conditioned on the implementation of a system capable of matching the entry and exit from the United States of travelers under the VWP using biometric identifiers. As such system was not implemented, the visa refusal rate requirement returned to 3%.

Greece officially joined the program on April 5, 2010.

On October 2, 2012, Secretary Janet Napolitano announced the inclusion of Taiwan into the program effectively as of November 1, 2012. Only holders of passports with a national identification number can benefit from the visa waiver.

In 2013 there was conflict over the United States-Israel Strategic Partnership Act of 2013 whose Senate version specified that satisfaction of the requirements regarding reciprocal travel privileges for U.S. nationals would be subject to security concerns. Many members of the House of Representatives opposed the security language because it seemed to validate Israel's tendency to turn away Arab Americans without giving any reason. None of the other 37 countries in the visa waiver program had such an exemption.

Hong Kong is the only jurisdiction with a higher Human Development Index than the United States whose citizens cannot enjoy the program. The visa refusal rate for Hong Kong dropped to 1.7% for HKSAR passport and 2.6% for British National (Overseas) passport in 2012. Hong Kong met all VWP criteria but did not qualify at the time because it was not legally a separate country, despite having its own passports and independent judicial system, monetary system and immigration control. The former Chief Executive of Hong Kong, Donald Tsang, raised the issue with then-Secretary of State Hillary Clinton during his visit to the United States in 2011 and was met with positive response. On May 16, 2013, a bipartisan amendment bill was passed by the Senate Judiciary Committee but not ratified into law. On August 10, 2015, the U.S. Consul General to Hong Kong and Macau, Clifford Hart, said during an interview with South China Morning Post that the visa waiver was "not happening anytime soon", as the Visa Waiver law required the participant to be a "sovereign state" and Hong Kong was not independent, thus ending the possibility of Hong Kong joining the program. He also denied that the failed lobbying effort of the HKSAR government on this issue was a result of the refusal of detaining Edward Snowden in 2013.

Chile joined the VWP on March 31, 2014.

On May 11, 2018, the U.S. threatened to remove Hungary from the Visa Waiver Program after multiple cases of passport fraud. An official report discovered a fraud scheme which allowed non-Hungarians to enter the U.S. under false identities.

As of December 2018, ESTA is no longer approved in real-time to qualifying passengers and passengers are required to apply no later than 72 hours before departure.

In July 2019, U.S. Ambassador to Poland Georgette Mosbacher stated that "Poland would fully qualify for the Visa Waiver Program within 3 to 6 months after September 2019" depending on bureaucratic procedures. On October 4, 2019, U.S. President Donald Trump confirmed that the Department of State had formally nominated Poland for entry into the Visa Waiver Program. On November 11, 2019 Poland officially joined the Program and became its 39th member.

On February 12, 2021, U.S. Embassy in Croatia's Chargé d’Affaires, a.i. Victoria J. Taylor, announced on Twitter that the refusal rate for business and tourist visas in Croatia in 2020 dropped to 2.69%, marking a step forward for Croatia to join the WVP "in the near future." On August 2, 2021, Secretary of State Antony Blinken announced that Croatia had been formally nominated to join the VWP. On September 28, 2021, Secretary of Homeland Security Alejandro Mayorkas officially announced that Croatia would join the VWP before December 1, 2021. Croatia joined the VWP on October 23, 2021.

On November 11, 2021, the Consular Services of Hungary announced that they had noted a consistent pattern of ESTA denials to Hungarian nationals born outside Hungary, who were automatically asked to apply for a regular visa instead.

Aspiring countries
Of the 19 road map countries listed in 2007, 11 have been admitted to the VWP. In 2021, the U.S. government cited eight countries aspiring to join the VWP:

Israel has not been included in the VWP reportedly in part because of its strict scrutiny of Palestinian Americans traveling to Israel, thus not fulfilling the reciprocity requirement. In addition, U.S. lawmakers and intelligence officials fear the country's entry into the program would facilitate espionage by Israel, and homeland security officials worry that too many Israelis overstay their visas.

In 2014, the European Union pressured the United States to extend the Visa Waiver Program to its five member states that were not yet included in it (Bulgaria, Croatia, Cyprus, Poland and Romania). In November 2014, the Bulgarian government announced it would not ratify the Transatlantic Trade and Investment Partnership unless the United States lifted the visa requirement for its nationals. Due to incomplete U.S. reciprocity, in March 2017 the European Parliament approved a non-binding resolution calling on the European Commission to revoke the visa-free travel for U.S. nationals to the Schengen Area. On May 2, 2017 the European Commission decided not act on the resolution and hoped to restart full visa reciprocity negotiations for the remaining EU member stats with the new U.S. Administration. As of 2022, three EU member states (Bulgaria, Cyprus and Romania) are still not included in the VWP, and nationals of Hungary born outside Hungary are automatically denied ESTA.

U.S. territories
The Visa Waiver Program applies to all permanently inhabited U.S. territories except American Samoa.

Guam and the Northern Mariana Islands
Although the U.S. Visa Waiver Program also applies to the U.S. territories of Guam and the Northern Mariana Islands, and therefore nationals of VWP countries may travel to these territories with an ESTA, both territories have additional visa waiver programs for certain nationalities. The Guam–CNMI Visa Waiver Program, first enacted in October 1988 and periodically amended, permits nationals from 12 countries in Asia, Europe and Oceania to enter Guam and the Northern Mariana Islands as tourists for up to 45 days without the need to obtain a U.S. visa or an ESTA. A parole policy also allows nationals of China visa-free access to the Northern Mariana Islands for up to 14 days.

American Samoa
U.S. visa policy does not apply to American Samoa, as it has its own entry requirements and maintains control of its own borders. Hence, neither a U.S. visa nor an ESTA can be used to enter American Samoa. If required, an entry permit or electronic authorization must be obtained from the Department of Legal Affairs of American Samoa.

Nationals of Canada, Israel, Marshall Islands, Micronesia, Palau, and countries in the U.S. Visa Waiver Program (except Croatia and Poland) may visit for up to 30 days without an entry permit. However, if arriving by air, they must apply online for an electronic authorization called "OK Board", at least 48 hours before travel, for a fee of $20.

Nationals of other countries need an entry permit, which must be requested by a local sponsor at the Immigration Office of the Department of Legal Affairs of American Samoa.

Statistics

Admissions

Visa refusal rate
To qualify for the Visa Waiver Program, a country must have had a visa refusal rate of less than 3% for the previous year. This refusal rate is based on applications for B visas, for tourism and business purposes. B visas are adjudicated based on applicant interviews, which generally last between 60 and 90 seconds.

Overstay rate
The table below shows the overstay rate, which is the portion of visitors arriving under the Visa Waiver Program who remained in the United States longer than the maximum allowed stay of 90 days. Some of these visitors later left the United States or legalized their immigration status.

Other visa waivers

Nationals of neighboring jurisdictions
Separate from the Visa Waiver Program,  permits the Attorney General and the Secretary of State (acting jointly) to waive visa requirements for admission to the United States in nonimmigrant status for nationals of foreign contiguous territories or adjacent islands or for residents of those territories or islands who have a common nationality with those nationals.

Under this provision, nationals of the following jurisdictions may travel to the United States without a visa:
Nationals of the Bahamas do not need a visa to travel to the United States if they apply for admission at a U.S. preclearance facility located in the Bahamas. Applicants 14 years of age or older must present a certificate issued by the Royal Bahamas Police Force indicating no criminal record.
British Overseas Territories citizens of Bermuda do not need a visa to visit the United States under most circumstances for up to 180 days.
British Overseas Territories citizens of the British Virgin Islands may travel without a visa to the U.S. Virgin Islands. They may also continue travel to other parts of the United States if they present a certificate issued by the Royal Virgin Islands Police Department indicating no criminal record.
Nationals of Canada do not need a visa to visit the United States under most circumstances. In addition, under the USMCA (and earlier NAFTA), they may work under a simplified procedure.
British Overseas Territories citizens of the Cayman Islands do not need a visa if they travel directly from the territory to the United States and present a police certificate indicating no criminal record.
Some nationals of Mexico do not need a visa to travel to the United States: government officials not permanently assigned to the United States and their accompanying family members, holding diplomatic or official passports, for stays of up to six months; members of the Kickapoo tribes of Texas or Oklahoma, holding Form I-872, American Indian Card; and crew members of Mexican airlines operating in the United States. Other nationals of Mexico may travel to the United States with a Border Crossing Card, which functions as a visa and has similar requirements. Under the USMCA (and earlier NAFTA), they may also work under a simplified procedure.
British Overseas Territories citizens of the Turks and Caicos Islands do not need a visa if they travel directly from the territory to the United States and present a police certificate indicating no criminal record.

Restrictions on the use of the Visa Waiver Program do not affect this class of travelers unless separately provided for by statute or regulation. For example, a Canadian citizen who has briefly overstayed a previous visit to the United States (by less than 180 days) will still not require a visa for future visits, while a VWP national who overstays will become ineligible for the VWP for life and will need a visa for future visits. ESTA is not required from British Overseas Territories citizens using one of the above waivers with the respective territory's passport, but it is required if they use the VWP with a British citizen passport.

Until 2003, this visa waiver was granted not only to nationals of those countries and territories, but also to permanent residents of Bermuda and Canada who were nationals of countries in the Commonwealth of Nations or Ireland.

Citizens of freely associated states

See also

Electronic System for Travel Authorization (ESTA)
Visa policy of the United States
US-VISIT
Western Hemisphere Travel Initiative

Notes

References

External links
  Visa Waiver Program, Bureau of Consular Affairs, U.S. Department of State.
 Visa Waiver Program, U.S. Customs and Border Protection.
 Electronic System for Travel Authorization (ESTA)
 Visa Waiver Program: Passport Requirements Timeline, Department of Homeland Security.
 VWP Signatory Carriers list as of 1 June 2016, US Customs & Border Protections. 
 Visa Waiver Program, Congressional Research Service.

Visa policy of the United States
United States Department of Homeland Security